Plasmodium gundersi is a parasite of the genus Plasmodium subgenus Giovannolaia.

Like all Plasmodium species P. gundersi has both vertebrate and insect hosts. The vertebrate hosts for this parasite are birds.

Taxonomy 

The parasite was first described by Bray in 1962.

Hosts 

Vertebrate hosts of this species include the eastern screech owl (Otus asio).

References 

gundersi
Parasites of birds